Radical 11 or radical enter meaning "enter", "come in (to)", "join" is one of 23 of the 214 Kangxi radicals that are composed of 2 strokes.
 
In the Kangxi Dictionary, there are 28 characters (out of 49,030) to be found under this radical.

While most Japanese dictionaries keep radical 11 as an independent radical, similar adjustments also happened in Japanese kanji simplification.

Evolution

Derived characters

Variant forms
There is a design nuance in different printing typefaces for this radical. Traditionally, the second stroke  starts with a short horizontal line in printing typeface. In handwriting form, the right-falling stroke goes more smoothly. The traditional typeface design is used in modern Traditional Chinese, Japanese, and Korean typefaces. Depending on each font's design, either form could be used in Traditional Chinese typefaces and Simplified Chinese typefaces.

The short horizontal line exists only in printing typeface, not in any handwriting form.

Literature 

Leyi Li: “Tracing the Roots of Chinese Characters: 500 Cases”. Beijing 1993, 
 KangXi:  page 125, character 32
 Dai Kanwa Jiten: character 1415
 Hanyu Da Zidian:  volume 1, page 102, character 1
 Dae Jaweon:  page 266, character 18

External links

Unihan data for U+5165

011